Coffee Fellows is a German coffeeshop chain founded in 1999 in Munich, Germany by Kathrin Tewes and co-managed by her and her husband, Olympic Gold medalist Stefan Tewes who joined her in management in 2000. As of 2018, they have about 209 stores in Germany, most of them franchised. This makes it the one which has the most, before Starbucks who have 160 stores. They have over 240 stores in Europe and Asia.

History
During a stay in London with her husband, Kathrin Tewes realised there were not as many coffeeshops of this kind in Germany. The idea of the coffee chain was to establish a comfortable environment (the company's slogan is "Feel at home"), luxurious, modern and cozy. Other drinks and snacks are also offered. The first store was opened in the Leopoldstraße in 1999, a second one in Düsseldorf flopped but they gained ground after this setback.

In 2000, Kathrin's husband Stefan quit his job as a consultant for Roland Berger to work with his wife. Since then the company has placed itself in the top 10 coffee shop chains in Germany.

In 2009 Coffee Fellows earned a Coffee Shop Award for the continuous improvements and further development of the concept as well as the whole management of the business. At the end of 2010 Coffee Fellows was running 36 shops, mostly in southern Germany, and the business planned to expand into northern Germany. In 2015, Tewes added 10 stores, and opened their 100th coffee shop in December 2015. This made them the third largest coffeeshop chain in Germany after McCafé and Starbucks.

Locations 
As of July 2021 there were 239 stores in the following countries:

References

External links
 
Official online shop

Food and drink companies established in 1999
Retail companies established in 1999
Coffeehouses and cafés in Germany
Food and drink companies based in Munich
Fast-food franchises
1999 establishments in Germany